Stainburn is a settlement and former civil parish about 7 miles from Whitehaven, now in the parish of Workington, in the Allerdale district, in the county of Cumbria, England. In 2018 the built-up area had an estimated population of 1705. Stainburn was also a ward, in 2011 the ward had a population of 1694. In 1961 the parish had a population of 246. Stainburn was on the A66 road until 20 December 2002 when it was bypassed.

Amenities 
Stainburn has a pub called The Briery on Stainburn Road. There was formerly a chapel that was probably about a quarter of a mile from the village but there are no remains.

History 
The name "Stainburn" means 'Stony stream'. Stainburn was formerly a township in the parish of Workington, from 1866 Stainburn was a civil parish in its own right until 1 April 1934 when it was abolished and merged with Workington and Winscales parishes.

References

External links 
 Cumbria County History Trust: Stainburn (nb: provisional research only – see Talk page)

Villages in Cumbria
Former civil parishes in Cumbria
Workington